Occinirvana eborea is a species of leafhopper in the subfamily Deltocephalinae. It is the only member of the genus Occinirvana and the tribe Occinirvanini, making them both monotypic taxa. O. eborea is endemic to Western Australia. It is closely related to Loralia, another genus of leafhoppers endemic to Australia.

O. eborea is an ivory and orange colored medium leafhopper. It is easily identifiable by its unique head shape with long antennae sprouting out high up on its head. Not much is known about the species' ecology, but it has been found on trees in the genus Casuarina.

References 

Deltocephalinae
Cicadellidae
Insects described in 1941